The 2022 FIBA 3x3 World Cup was an international 3x3 basketball event that featured separate competitions for men's and women's national teams. The tournament ran between 21 and 26 June 2022 in Antwerp, Belgium.

Medal summary

Medal table

Medalists

References

External links

 
2022
2021–22 in European basketball
FIBA 3x3 World Cup
FIBA 3x3 World Cup
3x3
Sports competitions in Antwerp